The Innerbelt Bridge was a truss arch bridge in Cleveland, Ohio carrying Interstate 90/Innerbelt Freeway over the Cuyahoga River.

History
The Innerbelt Bridge replaced the Central Viaduct.

The bridge had been intended to carry Interstate 71, but due to the lack of completion of a highway, carried Interstate 90 instead.

On November 13, 2008, all commercial truck traffic was banned from the bridge because it was deemed structurally insufficient after a review of a computer analysis. This had been rectified by mid-2010.

Replacement
As part of the Innerbelt Freeway rebuild, the bridge was replaced by the George V. Voinovich Bridges.  The Innerbelt Bridge was vacated in November 2013 after the completion of the westbound Voinovich bridge, built immediately to the north. Dismantling of the Innerbelt Bridge began January 13, 2014, and five of the nine remaining spans were imploded at dawn on July 12 with the remainder of the structure removed in the following weeks. The eastbound Voinovich bridge, built in the former location of the Innerbelt Bridge, opened in September 2016.

See also
 
 
 
 
 List of crossings of the Cuyahoga River

References

External links

Inner Belt Bridge - The Plain Dealer special section

1959 establishments in Ohio
2013 disestablishments in Ohio
Bridges completed in 1959
Bridges in Cleveland
Buildings and structures demolished in 2014
Interstate 90
Bridges over the Cuyahoga River
Road bridges in Ohio
Bridges on the Interstate Highway System
Truss arch bridges in the United States
Concrete bridges in the United States
Steel bridges in the United States
Cantilever bridges in the United States